Had to Cry Today is the fourth studio album by American blues rock musician Joe Bonamassa. Produced by Bob Held, it was released on August 24, 2004 by J&R Adventures and reached number five on the US Billboard Top Blues Albums chart. The title of the album is a reference to the song of the same name by English blues rock band Blind Faith from their 1969 self-titled album.

Reception

Music website Allmusic gave Had to Cry Today 3.5 out of five stars, a slight improvement on previous release Blues Deluxe.

Track listing

Chart performance

Personnel

Musical performers
Joe Bonamassa – guitars, acoustic guitar, vocals
Eric Czar – bass, fretless bass
Kenny Kramme – drums, percussion
Benny Harrison – Hammond organ
Jon Paris – harmonica

Additional personnel
Bob Held – production
Gary Tole – engineering, mixing
Eric Carlinsky – engineering assistance
Scott Hull – mastering
Dennis Friel – art direction, graphic design
Chris Marksbury – photography

References

2004 albums
Joe Bonamassa albums